Penybontfawr railway station was a station on the Tanat Valley Light Railway in Pen-y-bont-fawr, Powys, Wales. The station opened in 1904 and closed in 1951. The station site is now occupied by houses.

References

Further reading

Disused railway stations in Powys
Railway stations in Great Britain opened in 1904
Railway stations in Great Britain closed in 1951
Former Cambrian Railway stations